Ambás (San Pedru Ambás) is one of 41 parishes (administrative divisions) in Villaviciosa, a municipality within the province and autonomous community of Asturias, in northern Spain.

The postal code is 33311.

Villages and hamlets
Ambás 
Castiello  
Daja  
Lloses  
La Viesca  
Villabona
Xiana.

References 

Parishes in Villaviciosa